Allmir Ademi (Serbo-Croat: Almir Ademi; born 13 October 1984) is an Albanian-Swiss footballer who plays as midfielder for Swiss club VFC Neuhausen 90.

External links
FC Schaffhausen profile

References

1984 births
Sportspeople from Pristina
Kosovan emigrants to Switzerland
Living people
Swiss men's footballers
FC Schaffhausen players
Association football midfielders
Grasshopper Club Zürich players
FC Wil players
SV Eintracht Trier 05 players
Swiss Super League players
Swiss Challenge League players
2. Liga Interregional players